Micropterix corcyrella is a species of moth belonging to the family Micropterigidae. It was described by Walsingham, Lord Thomas de Grey, in 1919. It is found in Slovenia, Serbia and Montenegro, North Macedonia, Bulgaria and Greece.

Subspecies
Micropterix corcyrella corcyrella Walsingham, 1919 (Greece, Bulgaria, North Macedonia)
Micropterix corcyrella cephaloniensis Kurz, Kurz & Zeller, 2004 (Kefallinia)

References

External links
lepiforum.de

Micropterigidae
Moths described in 1919
Moths of Europe